The name Jobert is a French variant of the name Job.

People
People with the name Jobert include:

 Jobert of Syria (fl. 1172–1177), seventh Grand Master of the Knights Hospitaller in Syria
 Joséphine Jobert (born 1985), French actress and singer
 Marlène Jobert (born 1940), French actress, singer and author
 Michel Jobert (1921–2002), French politician

See also
 Magny-Jobert, a commune in the region of Bourgogne-Franche-Comté in France

References